Rybná nad Zdobnicí (until 1945 Německá Rybná) is a municipality and village in Náchod District in the Hradec Králové Region of the Czech Republic. It has about 400 inhabitants.

Etymology
The name Rybná was derived from rybník, i.e. "fish pond". It refers to a time when the area was full of ponds and swamps. Until 1945, the village was called Německá Rybná ("German Rybná"), which meant that it was settled under German law. Between 1945 and 1947, the municipality was named Orlická Rybná, and since 1947, it has its current name, referring to the nearby Zdobnice River.

Geography
It is situated in the Podorlická Uplands on the Rybenský Stream. The stream is a tributaty of the Zdobnice River, which forms the northern municipal border.

History
The first written mention of Rybná is from 1354. The village was probably founded around 1260. Rybná belonged to the Litice estate and shared its destinies and owners, which included the Podiebrad family and the Pernštejn family. In 1563, it was acquired by the Lords of Bubna of Litice, who owned it until 1809. In 1809–1815, it was in possession of the Windisch-Graetz family. The last aristocratic owners were the Parish family.

Transport
Rybná nad Zdobnicí lies on the railway line of local importance from Rokytnice v Orlických horách to Týniště nad Orlicí.

Culture
The municipality annually organizes the music festival Rybenské hudební léto ("Rybná musical summer") with concerts and recitation of poems. It was first held in 2006.

Sights
The landmark of Rybná nad Zdobnicí is the Church of Saint James the Great. It was built in 1748. The rectory is from 1848.

References

External links

Villages in Rychnov nad Kněžnou District